= Mōsō Telepathy =

Japanese manga series

- First tankōbon volume cover

妄想テレパシー (Mōsō Terepashī)
- Genre: Romantic comedy
- Manga
- Written by: Nobel
- Published by: Seikaisha
- Imprint: Seikaisha Comics
- Magazine: Saizensen
- Original run: February 9, 2016 – April 12, 2020
- Volumes: 7

Mōsō Telepathy (妄想テレパシー, Mōsō Terepashī) is a Japanese four-panel manga series written and illustrated by Nobel. It was serialized on Seikaisha's Twi4 Twitter account and Saizensen website from February 2016 to April 2020, with its chapters compiled into seven volumes released between July 2016 and April 2020.

== Synopsis ==
Nakano is a plain high school girl who can read minds. When she peeks into the mind of popular student Toda, she discovers that beneath Toda's cool personality is a mind full of erotic fantasies centered around her.

== Publication ==
Written and illustrated by Nobel, Mōsō Telepathy was serialized on Seikaisha's Twi4 Twitter account and Saizensen website from February 9, 2016 to April 12, 2020. Its chapters were compiled into seven tankōbon volumes released from July 9, 2016 to April 13, 2020.

No.	Release date	ISBN
1	July 9, 2016	978-4-06-369553-3
2	November 11, 2016	978-4-06-369559-5
3	March 11, 2017	978-4-06-369566-3
4	July 8, 2017	978-4-06-369575-5
5	November 28, 2017	978-4-06-510610-5
6	August 11, 2018	978-4-06-512727-8
7	April 13, 2020	978-4-06-519414-0

== Reception ==
The series was ranked second in the web category at the 3rd Next Manga Awards in 2017.
